\African-Asian Rural Development Organization (AARDO) formed in 1962, is an autonomous inter-governmental organization comprising 33, 17 from Africa, 15 from Asia as full members and one associate member from Asia.
 AARDO is devoted to develop understanding among members for better appreciation of each other's problems and to explore, collectively, opportunities for coordination of efforts for promoting welfare and eradication of thirst, hunger, illiteracy, disease and poverty amongst hundreds of millions of rural people. AARDO has its headquarters in New Delhi, India. India, one of the founding members of the AARDO, is the largest contributor in terms of membership contribution.

Member states 
 Burkina Faso
 Arab Republic of Egypt
 Federal Democratic Republic of Ethiopia
 Republic of Gambia
 Republic of Ghana
 Republic of Kenya
 Republic of Liberia
 Great Socialist People's Libyan Arab Jamahiriya
 Republic of Malawi
 Republic of Mauritius
 Kingdom of Morocco
 Federal Republic of Nigeria
 Republic of Sierra Leone
 Republic of the Sudan
 Republic of Zambia
 People's Republic of Bangladesh
 Republic of China (Taiwan)
 Republic of India
 Republic of Iraq
 Japan
 Hashemite Kingdom of Jordan
 Republic of Korea
 Republic of Lebanon
 Malaysia
 Sultanate of Oman
 Islamic Republic of Pakistan
 Republic of the Philippines
 Syrian Arab Republic
 Republic of Yemen

History

The first Afro-Asian Conference on Rural Reconstruction was held in New Delhi in January 1961. The President of India inaugurated the conference which was attended by twenty three countries and five international organizations. At the end of the conference, the African-Asian Rural Reconstruction Organization was formed.

Secretary Generals

References

External links 
 Official Site of AARDO
 Golden Jubilee celebration of AARDO : India and AARDO in Search of New Horizons

Economic development organizations
Rural community development